Premna protrusa is a species of plant in the family Lamiaceae. It is endemic to Fiji.

References

Endemic flora of Fiji
protrusa
Least concern plants
Taxonomy articles created by Polbot